Yvan Vouillamoz (born 18 June 1969) is a Swiss former ski jumper.

References

Swiss male ski jumpers
1969 births
Living people
People from Jura-North Vaudois District